is a private junior college in Machida, Tokyo, Japan. The precursor of the school was founded in 1926, and it was chartered as a university in 1968.

External links 
 Official website in Japanese

Private universities and colleges in Japan
Educational institutions established in 1926
Universities and colleges in Tokyo
Japanese junior colleges
Women's universities and colleges in Japan
Machida, Tokyo
1926 establishments in Japan